The Three Musketeers: D'Artagnan is an upcoming action adventure film and the first of a two-part epic saga directed by Martin Bourboulon, based on Alexandre Dumas' 1844 novel The Three Musketeers. The film stars François Civil, Vincent Cassel, Pio Marmaï, Romain Duris, and Eva Green. It will be released theatrically in France by Pathé on 5 April 2023. The sequel, The Three Musketeers: Milady, is set to be released on 13 December 2023. The two-part saga was co-produced by France, Germany and Spain on a $70 million budget and filmed back to back for 150 days from 16 August 2021 to 3 June 2022.

Cast 
 François Civil as D'Artagnan
 Vincent Cassel as Athos
 Pio Marmaï as Porthos
 Romain Duris as Aramis
 Eva Green as Milady de Winter
 Lyna Khoudri as Constance Bonacieux
 Louis Garrel as King Louis XIII
 Vicky Krieps as Anne of Austria
 Jacob Fortune-Lloyd as Duke of Buckingham
 Alexis Michalik as Villeneuve de Radis
 Patrick Mille as Henri de Talleyrand-Périgord
 Ivan Franek as Ardanza
 Ralph Amoussou as Hannibal

Production  
The project was announced on 11 February 2021. Produced by Dimitri Rassam for France's Chapter 2, a Mediawan Company, and Pathé, it was co-produced by M6 Films, Germany's Constantin Film and Spain's DeAPlaneta. It was pre-bought by M6, OCS and Canal Plus. The budget for the two-part saga was $70 million. The screenplay for both films was written by Matthieu Delaporte and Alexandre De La Patellière. The score was composed by Guillaume Roussel. Pathé will release the film theatrically in France and handle the international sales. 

This new adaptation of Alexandre Dumas' 1844 novel The Three Musketeers will introduce a new character, Hannibal, based on the true story of Louis Anniaba, the first Black musketeer in French history.

Filming 
The two films were shot back to back for 150 days on location in France, in landmarks such as the Louvre Palace, the Hôtel des Invalides, the Castles of Fontainebleau and Saint-Germain-en-Laye, Fort-la-Latte and Chantilly, as well as the citadel of Saint-Malo and the historic city center of Troyes. Filming began on 16 August 2021 and wrapped on 3 June 2022 at the Farcheville castle. 650 horses and 9,000 extras were used in the production.

Marketing
The first still from the film was unveiled on 2 September 2021.

On 19 April 2022, French magazine Première released two covers with the film's main cast (François Civil, Vincent Cassel, Romain Duris, Pio Marmaï and Eva Green). 

Two new stills from the film featuring D'Artagnan, Athos and Milady were unveiled on 5 May 2022. Pathé and Chapter 2 presented a 15-minute promo reel of the film at the 2022 Cannes Film Festival.

A teaser trailer and the film's official poster were unveiled on 5 December 2022. The official trailer was released on 15 February 2023.

Individual character posters were unveiled on 15 March 2023.

References

External links
 
 
 
 

French action adventure films
German action adventure films
Spanish action adventure films
2020s French films
2020s German films
2020s Spanish films
2020s French-language films
Films based on The Three Musketeers
Films set in the 1620s
Films set in France
Films set in Paris
Pathé films
M6 Films films
Constantin Film films
French-language German films
French-language Spanish films
Cultural depictions of Louis XIII